Basrah International Bank for Investment is an Iraqi commercial bank, with headquarters in Baghdad.

The bank has 12 branches in Baghdad (5 branches), Basrah (4 branches), Najaf (2 branches) and one branch in the Free Zone in Damascus.

See also
Iraqi dinar

References 
 https://web.archive.org/web/20090624014157/http://www.basrahbankfz.com/acontact.html
 https://web.archive.org/web/20090530013614/http://www.basrahbankfz.com/reports/2007.pdf

External links
 Official website 

Companies based in Baghdad
Banks of Iraq
Banks established in 1993
Iraqi companies established in 1993